Railer or The Railers may refer to:

Nature
Railer bat, found in Cameroon, Central African Republic, Republic of the Congo

Music
The Railers (band)
Railer (album), an album by the American band Lagwagon

Sport
The Railers (track team)
Reading Railers basketball
Worcester Railers hockey team